The Men's FIH Hockey World Cup is an international field hockey competition organised by the International Hockey Federation (FIH).  The tournament was started in 1971.  It is held every four years, bridging the four years between the Summer Olympics. Pakistan is the most successful team, having won the tournament four times. The Netherlands, Australia and Germany have each won three titles. Belgium and India have both won the tournament once.

The 2023 tournament was held in Bhubaneswar, India from 13 to 29 January. Germany defeated Belgium in a penalty shoot-out 5–4 after the match ended in a 3–3 draw to win their third World Cup title. The World Cup expanded to 16 teams in 2018.

History
The Hockey World Cup was first conceived by Pakistan's Air Marshal Nur Khan. He proposed his idea to the FIH through Patrick Rowley, the first editor of World Hockey magazine. Their idea was approved on 26 October 1969 and adopted by the FIH Council at a meeting in Brussels on 12 April 1970. The FIH decided that the inaugural World Cup would be held in October 1971, in Pakistan.

However, political issues would prevent that first competition from being played in Pakistan. The FIH had inadvertently scheduled the first World Cup to be played in Pakistan during the Bangladesh Liberation War. Furthermore, Pakistan and India had been at war with each other only six years earlier. When Pakistan invited India to compete in the tournament, a crisis arose. Pakistanis, led by cricketer Abdul Hafeez Kardar, protested against India's participation in the Hockey World Cup.

Given the intense political climate between Pakistan and India, the FIH decided to move the tournament elsewhere. In March 1971, coincidentally in the same month Bangladesh declared independence from Pakistan, the FIH decided to move the first Hockey World Cup to the Real Club de Polo grounds in Barcelona, Spain, which was considered a neutral and peaceful European site.

The FIH has set no requirements or limitations on the size of the competition. The 1971 Cup included only ten nations, the smallest World Cup. The 1978 Cup featured fourteen nations. The 2002, 2018 Cups featured sixteen nations. The remaining 10 World Cups have featured 12 nations.

The first three tournaments were held every two years. The 1978 Cup was the only tournament held three years from the previous one. It was halfway between the Summer Olympics hockey competition and has continued that way. In other words, the tournament has been held every four years ever since.

Trophy

The Hockey World Cup trophy was designed by the Bashir Moojid and created by the Pakistani Army. On 27 March 1971, in Brussels, the trophy was formally handed to FIH President Rene Frank by Mr H.E Masood, the Pakistani Ambassador to Belgium. The trophy consists of a silver cup with an intricate floral design, surmounted by a globe of the world in silver and gold, placed on a high blade base inlaid with ivory. At its peak is a model hockey stick and ball. Including the base, the trophy stands .

Format
The Hockey World Cup consists of a qualification stage and a final tournament stage. The format for each stage is the same.

Qualification
The qualification stage has been a part of the Hockey World Cup since 1977.  All participating teams play in the qualification round. The teams divide into two or more pools and compete for a berth in the final tournament. The top two teams are automatically qualified and the rest of the berths are decided in playoffs.

Final tournament
The final tournament features the continental champions and other qualified teams. Sometimes it also features the winners of the Summer Olympics' hockey competition or the continental runners-up. The teams divide into pools once more and play a round robin tournament. The composition of the pools is determined using the current FIH World Rankings.

Results

Summaries

Successful national teams
Twentyseven teams have qualified for a Hockey World Cup. Of these, thirteen teams have made it to the semifinals. Eight teams have made it through to the finals.

To date, the most successful teams are Pakistan, with four titles from six final appearances, the Netherlands, with three titles from seven final appearances, Germany and Australia with three titles from five final appearances, while India and Belgium won their lone titles in 1975 and 2018, respectively.

Below is a list of teams that have finished in the top four positions in the tournament:

* = host country
^ = includes results representing West Germany between 1971 and 1990
# = states that have since split into two or more independent countries

Performance by host nations
Nine nations have hosted the Hockey World Cup. Only the Netherlands (1973 and 1998) and Germany (2006) have won the tournament as hosts. Spain, England, and Pakistan emerged as host runners-up in the 1971, 1986 and 1990 tournaments. Australia placed third when it hosted the 1994 tournament in Sydney.

Performance by continental zones
To date, the finals of the Hockey World Cup have been contested by Asian, European and Oceania continental teams. European teams have won the most with six titles, followed by Asian teams with five titles. Australia is the only team from Oceania to win the tournament. Neither the Americas nor Africa have ever won the title.

Team appearances

^ = includes results representing West Germany between 1971 and 1990
# = states that have since split into two or more independent nations

Germany, India, the Netherlands and Spain are the only teams to have competed at each World Cup; 27 teams have competed in at least one World Cup.

Debut of teams
 

^ = Germany is a successor of West Germany and not a separate team.
# = Belarus was a part of Soviet Union but not successor, hence Belarus is a new separate entity.

Total number of teams which have participated in the World Cups through 2018 is 25, using FIH's view on successor teams

See also
 Field hockey at the Summer Olympics
 Men's FIH Hockey Junior World Cup
 Men's Indoor Hockey World Cup
 Women's FIH Hockey World Cup

References

External links
 

 

field
World Cup
Recurring sporting events established in 1971
Quadrennial sporting events